Couratari longipedicellata is a species of rainforest tree in the Monkeypot Family (Lecythidaceae). It is found only in Brazil. It is threatened by habitat loss.  Perhaps its most remarkable feature is its very large seeds; up to 9.5 cm (4 in) long by up to 2.3 cm (0.91 in) wide.

References

longipedicellata
Flora of Brazil
Vulnerable plants
Taxonomy articles created by Polbot